Michael George DeSombre (born 1968) is the former United States Ambassador to the Kingdom of Thailand. Prior to his Senate confirmation in January 2020, he was a partner of Sullivan & Cromwell. He is also a former chairman of Save the Children Hong Kong.

Biography
DeSombre joined Sullivan & Cromwell LLP in 1995 and became a partner of the law firm in 2004, where he led its mergers and acquisitions practice in Asia. His clients included Goldman Sachs, Anheuser-Busch InBev and Credit Suisse.

In 2013, he co-founded Republicans Overseas for Americans abroad. The organization focuses on tax reform and proposed replacing FATCA with territorial taxation for individuals to the House Ways and Means Committee, as part of a 2017 executive order to review the Dodd-Frank Act.

DeSombre supported the presidential candidacies of Mitt Romney and Jeb Bush.

He was nominated as U.S. Ambassador to Thailand by President Donald Trump on July 17, 2019. He is the first political appointee to the position since 1975. He was confirmed by the United States Senate on January 8, 2020, succeeding career diplomat Glyn T. Davies.

DeSombre has stated that his Office will primarily encourage the economic partnership between the two countries, with focus on American investment and Thailand's infrastructure projects and supply chains. He has also indicated that US firms are interested in increasing investment in Thailand, including in areas under the 1966 Amity treaty. He was sworn into office on March 2, 2020.

In late 2019, following his nomination, DeSombre resigned as chairman of Save the Children Hong Kong, having served since 2015. He was also a member of the board of the Hong Kong Forum.

Personal life and education
DeSombre was born in 1968 in Chicago, Illinois. He earned a Bachelor of Arts in Quantitative Economics and a Master of Arts in East Asian Studies from Stanford University. He received his Juris Doctor magna cum laude from Harvard Law School in 1995.

Prior to assuming his post in Bangkok in 2020, DeSombre lived in Hong Kong, residing in Asia for two decades. He is fluent in Mandarin Chinese, and also can speak Korean and Japanese. He is a supporter of the USA Rugby team, and is active in intellectual and philanthropic communities. He is married with four children.

References

1968 births
Living people
20th-century American lawyers
21st-century American lawyers
21st-century American diplomats
Ambassadors of the United States to Thailand
Columbia University alumni
Harvard Law School alumni
Lawyers from Chicago